Veslekjølen is a mountain in Lom Municipality in Innlandet county, Norway. The mountain is surrounded by several other notable mountains including Eisteinhovde to the southwest, Skarvhøi to the northeast, Ilvetjørnhøi to the east, Kvitingskjølen to the south, and Finnshalspiggen to the southwest.

See also
List of mountains of Norway

References

Lom, Norway
Mountains of Innlandet